The North Main Street Historic District is a historic district located along the 100 and 200 blocks of North Main Street in Greenville, Kentucky. The district includes 22 buildings, 20 of which are contributing buildings to the district's historic status. The primarily residential district is located just north of downtown Greenville. The houses within the district were mainly built in the early 20th century and designed in the Colonial Revival, Bungalow, and Queen Anne styles; an exception to this pattern is the George Short House, which was built in 1841 and is the oldest surviving house in the city. The district also includes the United Methodist Church, a Neoclassical church built in 1921.

The district was added to the National Register of Historic Places on August 15, 1985.

References

External links

Bungalow architecture in Kentucky
Colonial Revival architecture in Kentucky
Neoclassical architecture in Kentucky
Queen Anne architecture in Kentucky
Historic districts on the National Register of Historic Places in Kentucky
National Register of Historic Places in Muhlenberg County, Kentucky
Greenville, Kentucky